Cornelia Zangari Bandi (20 July 1664 – 15 March 1731) was an Italian noblewoman, generally known for the circumstances surrounding her mysterious death, which is frequently described as a possible case of spontaneous human combustion.

Biography

Family 
Cornelia Zangari was born in Longiano (Emilia-Romagna), Papal States, to Count Francesco Maria Zangari and his wife Margherita. She married Count Francesco Bandi and gave birth to Giovanni Carlo (future Cardinal of the Catholic Church), Maria Colomba, Margherita Felice, Giuseppe, Anna Teresa, Elisabetta and Anna Margherita. Her daughter Anna Teresa married Count Marco Aurelio Braschi, giving birth in 1717 to Giovanni Angelo, future Pope Pius VI (1775 – 1799).

Death 
According to the 1745 issue by the correspondent Paul Rolli (who translated, for the Philosophical Transactions of the Royal Society, a 1731 study by the Veronese historian Giuseppe Bianchini: Parere Sopra la Cagione della Morte della Signora Contessa Cornelia Zangari Ne' Bandi Cesenate (Opinion on cause of death of Lady Countess Cornelia Zangari), during her last dinner, the 66 years-old Countess was "dull and heavy". Some accounts report that the Countess was a brandy drinker, and that she used to sprinkle camphorated brandy on her body to relieve physical pain. The maid accompanied her to her room, and the two spent over three hours chatting and praying. The maid left her mistress already asleep. The next day, when she did not get up at the usual time, she went to wake her and found the remains of the Countess. The room was full of soot. The bed and the rest of the furniture had not been affected by the fire, but were covered by a greasy and smelly layer. On the floor there was an oil lamp covered with ashes, but without oil. The way the sheets were found seemed to indicate that the Countess had risen at some point during the night. The full account by Paul Rolli:

In popular culture 
Charles Dickens, in his preface to his novel Bleak House (1852/1853), writes about the Countess (whom he misnames Countess Cornelia de Baudi Cesenate) with regard to the "possibility of what is called spontaneous combustion."

See also
List of unsolved deaths

Gallery

References 

1664 births
1731 deaths
18th-century Italian women
Countesses
Deaths from fire
Paranormal
People from Cesena
Unsolved deaths
Spontaneous human combustion